Never Surrender is the sixth studio album by Canadian hard rock band Triumph, released in 1982. The album reached #26 on the Billboard Albums chart assisted by the singles "All the Way", "A World of Fantasy" and "Never Surrender" which hit #2, #3 and #23, respectively, on the Billboard's Mainstream Top Rock Tracks chart in 1983. "All the Way" (the third of the three tracks to chart) was Triumph's highest charting song on the Top Rock Tracks chart, but did not sustain that level of popularity with Triumph fans as the song is not included on their 1985 live album Stages, the later Classics (a Greatest Hits album) or 2005's Livin' for the Weekend: The Anthology album.

In Canada, the album peaked at No. 29 on the RPM album chart (compared to No. 13 for their previous album, Allied Forces) and none of the singles managed to reach the Top 100 of the RPM Singles chart, although they received some airplay at album-oriented rock stations.

A remastered CD was first released in 1985 on MCA Records (then again in 1995 on the band's own TRC label). A new remaster was released in November 2004 on the band's own label TML Entertainment.

Track listing
All songs by Rik Emmett / Michael Levine / Gil Moore except where otherwise noted.

Side 1:
 "Too Much Thinking" – 5:39
 "A World of Fantasy" (Emmett, Levine, Moore, Tammy Patrick) – 5:03
 "A Minor Prelude" – 0:44
 "All the Way" – 3:45
 "Battle Cry" – 5:00

Side 2:
 "Overture (Processional)" – 1:52
 "Never Surrender" – 6:41
 "When the Lights Go Down" – 5:08
 "Writing on the Wall" – 3:39
 "Epilogue (Resolution)" – 2:42

Personnel 
 Rik Emmett – vocals, acoustic guitars, electric guitars, 12-string guitar, slide guitar pedal steel guitar, guitar synthesizers, guitar pedalboard, dobro (8)
 Michael Levine – bass guitar, pianos, synthesizers, organ
 Gil Moore – drums, percussions, vocals

Production 
 Triumph and David Thoener – producers
 Ed Stone – engineer
 Hugh Cooper – assistant engineer
 Joe Owens – director
 Joe Brescio – mastering
 Brett Zilahi – remastering on 2004 re-issue
 Bob Ludwig – remastering on 1985 and 1995 issues
 Dean Motter – art direction, design

Charts

Certifications

References

1982 albums
Triumph (band) albums
Albums recorded at Metalworks Studios